Arnaud Denjoy (5 January 1884 – 21 January 1974) was a French mathematician.

Biography
Denjoy was born in Auch, Gers. His contributions include work in harmonic analysis and differential equations. His integral was the first to be able to integrate all derivatives. Among his students is Gustave Choquet. He is also known for the more general broad Denjoy integral, or Khinchin integral.

Denjoy was an Invited Speaker of the ICM with talk Sur une classe d'ensembles parfaits en relation avec les fonctions admettant une dérivée seconde généralisée in 1920 at Strasbourg and with talk Les equations differentielles periodiques in 1950 at Cambridge, Massachusetts. In 1931 he was the president of the Société Mathématique de France. In 1942 he was elected a member of the Académie des sciences and was its president in 1962.

Denjoy married in 1923 and was the father of three sons. He died in Paris in 1974. He was an atheist with a strong interest in philosophy, psychology, and social issues.

The asteroid (19349) Denjoy is named in his honor.

Selected publications
Une extension de l'intégrale de Lebesgue, Académie des Sciences, pp. 859–862 (1912)
Les continus cycliques et la représentation conforme, Bulletin de la Société Mathématique de France, pp. 97-124 (1942)
Sur les fonctions dérivées sommables., Bulletin de la Société Mathématique de France, pp. 161-248 (1915)
Introduction à la théorie de fonctions de variables réelles, vol. 1, Hermann 1937
Aspects actuels de la pensée mathématique, Bulletin de la Société Mathématique de France, vol. 67, 1939, pp. 1–12 (supplément), numdam
Leçons sur le calcul des coefficients d'une série trigonométrique, 4 vols., 1941–1949
L'énumération transfinie, 4 vols., Gauthier-Villars, 1946–1954
Mémoire sur la dérivation et son calcul inverse, 1954, published by Éditions Jacques Gabay
Articles et Mémoires, 2 vols., 1955
Jubilé scientifique, 1956
Un demi-siècle de Notes académiques (1906–1956), 2 vols., Gauthier-Villars, 1957 (collection of Denjoy's essays)
Hommes, Formes et le Nombre, 1964

See also 
 Denjoy theorem (disambiguation)
 Denjoy integral (disambiguation)
 Denjoy–Luzin theorem
 Denjoy–Luzin–Saks theorem
 Denjoy–Riesz theorem
 Denjoy–Young–Saks theorem
 Denjoy–Carleman theorem
 Denjoy–Carleman–Ahlfors theorem
 Denjoy's theorem on rotation number
 Denjoy–Koksma inequality
 Denjoy–Wolff theorem

References

External links 

 
 

1884 births
1974 deaths
People from Auch
French atheists
20th-century French mathematicians
École Normale Supérieure alumni
Members of the French Academy of Sciences
Foreign Members of the USSR Academy of Sciences
Recipients of the Lomonosov Gold Medal